Dharmapuram Adhinam Arts and Science College is a private college located at Dharmapuram near Mayiladuthurai. The college is managed by the Dharmapuram Adheenam. Dharmapuram Adhinam Arts College was established in the year 1946. It is affiliated to Bharathidasan university, Trichy.

References 

 

Arts colleges in India
Colleges in Tamil Nadu
Education in Mayiladuthurai district